is a Prefectural Natural Park in Wakayama Prefecture, Japan. Established in 1954, the park spans the borders of the municipalities of Gobō, Hidaka, and Mihama. The park's central feature is the eponymous .

See also
 National Parks of Japan
 List of Places of Scenic Beauty of Japan (Wakayama)

References

External links
  Map of Enju Kaigan Prefectural Natural Park

Parks and gardens in Wakayama Prefecture
Gobō, Wakayama
Hidaka, Wakayama
Mihama, Wakayama
Protected areas established in 1954
1954 establishments in Japan